Lake Nineteen also known as Nineteen Lake, is a  lake that is located in south-western Schoolcraft County, Michigan in the Hiawatha National Forest.  It is east of the county line with Alger and north of the county line with Delta County.  Nearby lakes include Hugaboom Lake, Mowe Lake, Blue Lake, Corner-Straits Chain of lakes, Ironjaw Lake, Verdant Lake, and Round Lake.

See also
List of lakes in Michigan

References 

Lakes of Schoolcraft County, Michigan
Lakes of Michigan